Elemér Bokor (January 19, 1887, Sátoraljaújhely, Zemplén County – September 1, 1928, Budapest) was a Hungarian entomologist who specialised in Coleoptera.

Bokor worked on cave fauna. His collection of Palaearctic beetles is in the Hungarian Natural History Museum.

Works
Új vakbogarak Magyarország faunájából. Annales Musei Nat. Hung. XI. 1913. *Három új vakbogár Magyarország faunájából. Annales Musei Nat. Hung. XI. 1913.
A vak Trechusok szeméről. Rovartani Lapok, XXI., 1914.
A magyarhoni barlangok ízeltlábúi. Barlangkutatás, IX., 1921.
Az Abaligeti-barlang. Földr. Közl. LIII., 1925.

References
 Székely Kinga: 100 éve történt. Karszt és Barlang, 1987. I-II.
 Groll, E. K. [ed.]: 2006, Entomologen der Welt (Biographien, Sammlungsverbleib). Datenbank 2. Version, DEI im ZALF e. V.: „Bokor, Elemír (= Elemér)": (internet).Portrait

1887 births
1928 deaths
People from Sátoraljaújhely
Hungarian entomologists
20th-century Hungarian zoologists